The Silent Shout Tour was the debut concert tour by Swedish electronic music duo The Knife in support of their album Silent Shout.

The concert in Trädgår'n, Gothenburg, Sweden was recorded in 5.1 surround sound and released on DVD as Silent Shout: An Audio Visual Experience.

Setlist
"Pass This On"
"The Captain"
"We Share Our Mothers' Health"
"You Make Me Like Charity"
"Marble House"
"Forest Families"
"Kino"
"Heartbeats"
"Silent Shout"
"From Off to On"
encore:
"Like a Pen"

Reception
Jon Pareles of The New York Times described the concert at Webster Hall as "an elaborately synthetic production that flaunted technology but conjured emotion". Resident Advisor rated the concert at Scala, London 4 out of 5 and in a subsequent feature called it "one of the most memorably bizarre performances the electronic music scene has ever witnessed".

Tour dates

Notes

2006 concert tours